Dubarry, DuBarry or du Barry may refer to:
Madame du Barry (1743–1793), mistress of King Louis XV of France
DuBarry (film), a lost 1915 American-Italian silent film about Madame du Barry
 Madame Du Barry (1917 film), starring Theda Bara
 Madame DuBarry (1919 film), a German production directed by Ernst Lubitsch and featuring Pola Negri
A Modern Dubarry, a 1927 German silent film
Du Barry, Woman of Passion, a 1930 film starring Norma Talmadge
 Madame Du Barry (1934 film), starring Delores del Rio
The Loves of Madame Dubarry, a 1935 British historical film
Du Barry Was a Lady, a 1939 Broadway musical of the 1930s-1940s
 Madame du Barry (1954 film), a French film
 The Dubarry (1951 film), a 1951 German musical film
Dubarry of Ireland, a footwear and clothing company
Dubarry Park, a rugby union stadium in Ireland
Thibault Dubarry (born 1987), French rugby union player
Soup du Barry (also Velouté du Barry and Crème du Barry), a cauliflower soup

See also
Barry (disambiguation)